Abdelillah Nhaila (born December 2, 1981) is a Moroccan amateur boxer who competed in the 2008 Summer Olympics but lost his first bout to Samir Mammadov.

External links
Abdelillah Nhaila at Sports Reference

1981 births
Living people
Boxers at the 2008 Summer Olympics
Olympic boxers of Morocco
Moroccan male boxers
Place of birth missing (living people)
Flyweight boxers
21st-century Moroccan people